Xestia alpicola, the northern dart, is a moth of the family Noctuidae. It is found from northern Europe across the Palearctic to central Siberia and in the Alps.

Technical description and variation

The wingspan is 35–40 mm. Forewing grey shaded with fuscous, with only a slight reddish tint in the middle, the stigmata, which are large, and the lines, fairly distinct; hindwing fuscous with pale fringe; the female smaller than the male; — ab. hyperborea Zett. has the grey ground more varied with reddish and fuscous, the markings clearer; — in ab. aquilonaris Zett., grey clouded with brownish fuscous, the markings are blurred; all these greyer forms are from Lapland; — ab. alpina Humphr. & Westw., is buff grey varied with red, occurring in the North of Scotland and Ireland; — ab. coerulescens Tutt is the rich red-brown form with lilac-grey markings and blackish wedge-shaped streaks, found in the Shetland isles; — ab. carnica Hering is the rufous insect taken in the Carinthian Alps.

Biology
Adults are on wing from June to August. It has a two-year life cycle, the larvae overwintering twice.

Larva brown-red; dorsum with dark striae forming a row of V-shaped marks; dorsal and subdorsal lines ochreous, partially black-edged; spiracular pale and obscure. The larvae mainly feed on Empetrum nigrum, but have also been recorded from other plants, including Calluna

Subspecies
Xestia alpicola alpicola (Zetterstedt, 1839) (northern Europe to central Siberia)
Xestia alpicola alpina (northern British Isles)
Xestia alpicola carnica (Hering, 1846) (Alps)
Xestia alpicola ryffelensis (Oberthür, 1904) (Alps)

References

External links
 Lepiforum
 Funet
 Fauna Europaea
 UKmoths

Xestia
Moths of Europe
Moths of Asia
Moths described in 1843